Län (Swedish), lääni (Finnish) and len (Norwegian) refer to the administrative divisions used in Sweden and previously in Finland and Norway. The provinces of Finland were abolished on January 1, 2010. In Norway, the term was in use between 1308 and 1662.

They are also sometimes used in other countries, especially as a translation of the Russian word volost. During the period when Finland was a part of the Russian Empire (1809-1917), when Russian was made an official language alongside Swedish, it was synonymous with the word guberniya.

The term

The word literally means "fief" and is cognate with English . The usual English language terms used are separate for the two countries, where Sweden has chosen to translate the term as "county" while Finland prefers "province". With a shared administrative tradition spanning centuries, ending only in 1809, this is a separation by convention, rather than by distinction.

The term matches reasonably well the British term "county", but not so well the American term "county" which is usually much smaller in population, akin to a Swedish "kommun" (and nor does the concept of an American state compare well to län).

 In the Swedish Empire, all lands conquered became provinser (provinces); Swedish law, which granted the common people much more  freedom and influence than any other European law at the time, was not extended to them, remaining confined to the landskap (in plural) which made up the Swedish-and-Finnish heartland (roughly corresponding to present-day Sweden and  Finland). Examples of such former Swedish provinser are Estonia and Swedish Pomerania. 

Before län were adopted, the historical provinces were defined as either "hertigdöme" (duchy) or "grevskap" (county), which adds further confusion. Later all historical provinces have been given "hertigdöme" (duchy) as honorary title.

The län
In Sweden a län is but an arm of the executive power of the national government, and has no autonomy nor legislative power. The län subdivision does not always match the traditional provinces,  which are called landskap (singular and plural) in Swedish (including Swedish-speaking Finland) and maakunnat (singular maakunta) in Finnish. The same situation existed in Finland until län/lääni were abolished in 2010.

 Counties of Sweden — (Sveriges län)
 Provinces of Finland (abolished 2010) — (Suomen läänit / Finlands län)

Historically the term guberniya was used for the län/lääni in the Grand Duchy of Finland as a part of Russia from 1809 to 1917. See Governorates of the Grand Duchy of Finland.

The landsting

In every Swedish län (except Gotland) there was a landsting. This was a locally elected assembly, which collected tax and had responsibility for a number of services to the population. The main responsibilities were health care, public transport and culture. As of 2020, the landsting have been replaced by regions.

The landshövding
The governor has the title landshövding (Swedish) (previously maaherra in Finnish). He or she is appointed by the government, and presides over the länsstyrelse (Swedish; previously  lääninhallitus in Finnish) -  translated as "County Administrative Board".  The governor's office is administrative by nature, which is also hinted at by the now obsolete title Konungens befallningshavande - "the King's Deputy" - and traditionally  used as an honourable post for politicians to conclude their careers. In Finland, the office of governor was abolished in 2010. However, the office still exists in the autonomous province of Åland. The governor of a Swedish county is appointed to represent the central government, rather than elected by the people.

Notes

Subdivisions of Finland
Subdivisions of Sweden
Types of administrative division